The 2015–16 New Zealand Football Championship season (currently known as the ASB Premiership  for sponsorship reasons) is the twelfth season of the NZFC since its establishment in 2004. Eight teams are involved this season, after Wanderers SC withdrew from the competition. Auckland City and Team Wellington will represent the ASB Premiership in the 2016 OFC Champions League after finishing Champions and Runners-up respectively in the 2014–15 competition.

Clubs

Kits

Regular season

League table

Positions by round

Fixtures and results
The 2015–16 season sees every team play the other both home and away. Due to Auckland City's participation in the 2015 FIFA Club World Cup, several matches have been rescheduled.

Round 5 (rescheduled)

Round 1

Round 2

Round 3

Round 4

Round 5

Round 6

Round 7

Round 8

Round 9

Round 4 (rescheduled)

Round 10

Round 11

Round 12

Round 13

Round 12 (rescheduled)

Round 14

Finals series

Semi-finals

Grand final

Statistics

Top scorers

Own goals

References

External links
 ASB Premiership website

New Zealand Football Championship seasons
1
New Zealand Football Championship
New Zealand Football Championship